Vivian Island is a member of the Arctic Archipelago in the territory of Nunavut. The uninhabited island lies in Peel Sound. Prince of Wales Island's Browne Bay is to the west, while Somerset Island is to the east. The smaller Lock Island is to the northwest, and the larger Prescott Island is to the south.

References

External links 
 Vivian Island in the Atlas of Canada - Toporama; Natural Resources Canada

Uninhabited islands of Qikiqtaaluk Region